HHaA is a human pseudogene believed to be responsible for fur-like body hair.  In humans the gene has become deactivated making it a pseudogene, however there is variation in the degree of body hair among human beings and occasional examples have been found of people where the gene is active leading to very thick body hair as a result. Although the mutation was dated to 240 000 by Winter et al., it is also present in the Vindija Neandertal and Altai Denisovan sequences. Hence the dating must be older than 700 00 kya and possibly more than 1 mya considering the latter's divergence date. Given the divergence of pubic and head hair lice, the date of the mutation may be as old as 3.3 million years old.

References

Pseudogenes